Im Ji-eun (born February 27, 1973) is a South Korean actress.

Filmography

Television series

Film

Awards and nominations

References

External links
 Im Ji-eun Fan Cafe at Daum 
 
 
 

1973 births
Living people
South Korean television actresses
South Korean film actresses